The following is a list of notable events and releases that happened in 1997 in music in South Korea.

Debuting and disbanded in 1997

Debuting

Baby Vox
Diva
Jaurim
Jinusean
No Brain
NRG
Sechs Kies
S.E.S.
U-BeS
Uptown
YB

Solo debuts
Kim Hyun-jung
Kim Ji-hoon
Kim Ji-hyun
Haha
Hong Kyung-min
Park Ji-yoon
Pearl
Yoo Seung-jun

Disbanded groups
N.EX.T
Solid

Releases in 1997

January

February

March

April

May

June

July

August

September

October

November

References

 
South Korean music
K-pop